Bobby Lee Johnson (born December 14, 1961) is a former professional American football wide receiver in the National Football League for three seasons for the New York Giants.  He played college football at the University of Kansas.

He is best known as the receiver who caught Phil Simms' 4th and 17 pass in Minnesota in week 12 of the 1986 season.  It is the play that many football historians feel turned the tide of the Giants championship run.  The play set up Raul Allegre's game winning 33-yard field goal.  The Giants won the game 22 - 20.

Following the 1986 NFL season, Johnson was traded to the San Diego Chargers. He was routinely late to practice as a result of his blossoming crack cocaine addiction and was subsequently cut two weeks later. In 1989, after years of homelessness and addiction, Johnson sold his Super Bowl XXI ring at a pawn shop in Nashville, TN for $250. Johnson has been clean since 2002. In 2016, Lee Einsidler, a sports fan, led the charge to reunite Johnson with his ring. Enlisting the help of Johnson's former head coach, Bill Parcells, Einsidler was successful in doing so.

References

1961 births
Living people
American football wide receivers
Kansas Jayhawks football players
New York Giants players
Sportspeople from East St. Louis, Illinois
Players of American football from Illinois